Jeannine Davis-Kimball (November 23, 1929 – April 3, 2017) was an American archaeologist who specialized in gender studies and prehistory.

Early years and education
Jeannine Davis-Kimball was born November 23, 1929, in Driggs, Idaho.

In 1972, she studied at the Autonomous University of Madrid in Spain. She graduated from California State University, Northridge in 1978 with a Bachelor of Arts degree and earned a Ph.D. in 1988 from the University of California, Berkeley.

Research and career
As a result of her work on her doctoral thesis, she moved to Central Asia in 1985 to study nomads. She became known above all for her research of the "Amazon tombs" in Southern Russia. In the 1990s, Davis-Kimball and her Russian archeology colleague, Leonid Jablonski, found in southern Russia and Ukraine numerous tombs (kurgans) of Scythian or Sarmatian women who had been buried along with weapons and armor. An important locality is a necropolis at Pokrovka.

Davis-Kimball explored areas where there are still women participating in active nomadic culture who shoot with bows and ride regularly. She discovered in Western Mongolia, which is inhabited mainly by Kazakhs, the sought-after genetic traits in women. The nomadic women of this area were experienced archers and riders; their equipment and their jewelry resembled the finds discovered by Davis Kimball in the kurgan. This was the reason she was looking for "living proof of the Amazons" in this region. She came across a blonde Kazakh girl named Maryemgül who was already a very good rider at the age of nine. Due to the deviating from the other members of the tribe's phenotype (blond, Central Asian features) of the girl, Davis-Kimball assumed that they have found a descendant of the "Amazon women". The black-haired mother of the girl also said that every now and then, blonde girls were born in their family and in the surrounding area. To prove their assumptions, Davis-Kimball and Joachim Burger had a genetic test done. They were able to prove that the genetics of the Kazakh girl were almost 100 percent consistent with the genetic profile of the "Amazon women" discovered in kurgans. The connection of the fabled Amazons to the Kazakh tribe in western Mongolia is not conclusively proven.

She died April 3, 2017, in Ventura, California.

Selected works
 Proportions in Achaemenid art, 1988
 Finding guide to the California Indian Library Collections : Glenn County, 1993
 Finding guide to the California Indian Library Collections : Humboldt County , 1993
 Finding guide to the California Indian Library Collections : Madera County, 1993
 Finding guide to the California Indian Library Collections : Marin County, 1993
 Finding guide to the California Indian Library Collections : Shasta County, 1993
 Finding guide to the California Indian Library Collections : Tehama County, 1993
 Worker owner privatization manual, 1993
 Organizing and caring for photographic collections using computer techniques : an introductory manual, 1993
 Pomo Indians [interactive multimedia]: compiled by Jeannine and Randal S. Brandt., 1994
 Turkestan today, 1994
 Miwok Indians, 1994
 Kurgans on the left bank of the Ilek : excavatins at Pokrovka 1990-1992, 1995
 Nomads of the Eurasian steppes in the early iron age, 1995
 Kurgans, ritual sites, and settlements : Eurasian Bronze and Iron Age, 2000
 Warrior women : an archaeologist's search for history's hidden heroines, 2003
 Harcos nők Egy régész kutatása a történelem rejtett hősnői után., 2004
 Amazon warrior women, 2004
 Donne guerriere : le sciamane delle vie della seta, 2009
 Nomads of the Altai Mountains : the Mongols : ancient traditions in a modern world, 2010
 The Seymours & the Kimballs : a collected ethnography & genealogy of a plethora of descendants, 2011
 Archéologie : [dossier], 2012
 Amazonlar : tarihin gizli kalmış kadın kahramanlarının peşinde bir arkeolog, 2013

See also
 Amazons

References 

1929 births
2017 deaths
People from Driggs, Idaho
American archaeologists
Autonomous University of Madrid alumni
California State University, Northridge alumni
University of California, Berkeley alumni
Prehistorians
Gender studies academics
Matriarchy
20th-century American non-fiction writers
20th-century American women writers
21st-century American non-fiction writers
21st-century American writers
21st-century American women writers
American women archaeologists